In the 2007–08 season, Partizan Belgrade will compete in the Basketball League of Serbia, Radivoj Korać Cup, Adriatic League and Euroleague.

Players

Roster

Roster changes
In
  Milt Palacio (from  Utah Jazz)
  Bogdan Riznić (from youth categories)
  Čedomir Vitkovac (from  Vojvodina)
  Strahinja Milošević (from  Vojvodina)
  Slavko Vraneš (from  Budućnost Podgorica)
  Darko Balaban (from youth categories)

Out
  Luka Bogdanović (to  Le Mans)
  Boris Bakić (to  Crvena zvezda)
  Predrag Drobnjak (to  Akasvayu Girona)
  Kosta Perović (to  Golden State Warriors)
  Vonteego Cummings (to  Maccabi Tel Aviv)

Competitions

Basketball League of Serbia

Regular season

Semifinals

Final

Adriatic League

Standings

Regular season

Playoffs

Final four

Semifinals

Final

Kup Radivoja Koraća

Quarterfinals

Semifinals

Final

Euroleague

Regular season

Group C

{|
|-
|  style="vertical-align:top; width:33%;"|

Top 16

Group D

Quarterfinals

Individual awards
Euroleague

All-EuroLeague Team
 Nikola Peković, All-Euroleague Second Team

EuroLeague MVP of the Month
 Milt Palacio - March

Euroleague Weekly MVPs
 Nikola Peković - Regular season, Week 1
 Novica Veličković - Regular season, Week 13

Adriatic League

MVP of the Round
 Nikola Peković – Round 8
 Nikola Peković – Round 13
 Nikola Peković – Playoffs, Game 2
 Nikola Peković – Semi-final
 Nikola Peković – Final

Radivoj Korać Cup

Finals MVP
 Milenko Tepić

Basketball League of Serbia

Finals MVP
 Nikola Peković

Statistic

Results overview in EuroLeague

References

External links
 Official website 

KK Partizan seasons
Partizan
Partizan